Julissa del Carmen Acevedo (born 7 August 1991) is a Nicaraguan footballer who plays as a forward for the Nicaragua women's national team.

International career
Acevedo capped for Nicaragua at senior level during the 2010 CONCACAF Women's World Cup Qualifying qualification, three Central American and Caribbean Games editions (2010, 2014 and 2018) and the 2012 CONCACAF Women's Olympic Qualifying Tournament qualification.

References 

1991 births
Living people
Nicaraguan women's footballers
Women's association football forwards
Nicaragua women's international footballers
Central American Games silver medalists for Nicaragua
Central American Games medalists in football